Let's Be Us Again is the sixth studio album by American country music group Lonestar. It was released in 2004 on BNA Records, and has been certified gold by the RIAA in the United States. The album produced three singles for the group on the Billboard Hot Country Songs charts: the title track (number 4), "Mr. Mom" (number 1), and "Class Reunion (That Used to Be Us)" (number 16). Additionally, "Somebody's Someone" charted at number 53 from unsolicited airplay.

The song "Let Them Be Little" was also recorded in late 2004 by its co-writer Billy Dean on his 2004 album Let Them Be Little, from which it was released as a single. Dean's rendition of the song reached number 8 on the country charts in early 2005.

Track listing
All tracks produced by Dann Huff except "Somebody's Someone" produced by Lonestar.

Personnel 
Compiled from liner notes.

Lonestar 
 Richie McDonald – lead vocals, keyboards, acoustic guitar
 Dean Sams – acoustic piano, keyboards, acoustic guitar, harmonica, backing vocals
 Michael Britt – electric lead guitar, acoustic lead guitar, backing vocals
 Keech Rainwater – drums, percussion

Additional musicians 
 Tim Akers – keyboards
 Jimmy Nichols – keyboards, acoustic piano, strings
 Matt Rollings – acoustic piano
 Dann Huff – electric guitars
 B. James Lowry – acoustic guitar
 John Willis – acoustic guitar
 Paul Franklin – steel guitar
 Mike Brignardello – bass guitar
 Keith Horne – bass guitar (13)
 Paul Leim – drums
 Eric Darken – percussion
 Rob Hajacos – fiddle
 Jonathan Yudkin – fiddle, mandolin
 Dan Hochhalter – fiddle (13)
 Russell Terrell – backing vocals
 Randy Owen – lead vocals (12)

Technical 
 Adam Ayan – mastering at Gateway Mastering (Portland, Maine)
Tracks 1-12
 Mike "Frog" Griffith – production coordinator 
 Jeff Balding – recording, mixing
 Brady Barnett – recording 
 Jed Hackett – recording, recording assistant 
 Mark Hagen – recording 
 Justin Niebank – recording 
 David Bryant – recording assistant, mix assistant 
 Jesse Amend – recording assistant 
 Scott Kidd – mix assistant 
 Christopher Rowe – digital editing 
 Recorded at Emerald Entertainment and Jane's Place (Nashville, Tennessee).
 Mixed at Emerald Entertainment 
Track 13
 Pat McMakin – recording, mixing 
 Paul Hart – recording assistant 
 Lowell Reynolds – mix assistant 
 Recorded at Sony/Tree Studios (Nashville, Tennessee).
 Mixed at Blackbird Studio (Nashville, Tennessee).

Design 
 Astrid Herbold May – art direction, design  
 Russ Harrington – photography 
 Melissa Schleicher – grooming 
 Trish Townsend – stylist

Charts

Weekly charts

Year-end charts

Certifications

References 

2004 albums
Albums produced by Dann Huff
BNA Records albums
Lonestar albums